The 1978–79 USC Trojans men's basketball team represented the University of Southern California during the 1978–79 NCAA Division I men's basketball season. Led by head coach Bob Boyd, they played their home games at the L. A. Sports Arena in Los Angeles, California as members of the Pac-10 Conference. The Trojans were 14–4 in the Pac-10 and finished second in the conference regular season standings behind UCLA. USC received a bid to the NCAA tournament, the schools fifth appearance all-time.

Roster

Schedule and results

|-
!colspan=9 style=| Non-conference regular season

|-
!colspan=9 style=| Pac-10 regular season

|-
!colspan=9 style=| NCAA Tournament

Rankings

References

Usc Trojans
USC Trojans men's basketball seasons
USC
USC Trojans
USC Trojans